Isolitaphididae is an extinct family of aphids in the order Hemiptera. There are at least three genera in Isolitaphididae.

Genera
These three genera belong to the family Isolitaphididae:
 † Hormatalis Wegierek & Wang, 2018
 † Isolitaphis Poinar, 2017
 † Prolavexillaphis Liu, Qiao & Yao, 2017

References

Sternorrhyncha